Herff–Brooks Corporation was a brass era automobile manufacturer based in Indianapolis, Indiana, in 1914 to 1916.

History 
Herff-Brooks formed in 1913 to take on the sales of the Marathon Motor Works of Nashville, Tennessee. By 1915 Herff-Brooks purchased the now defunct Marathon machinery, and along with some personnel set up a new factory at the Wayne Works in Richmond, Indiana.

Herff-Brooks were identical to the 1914 Marathons with minor improvements. A 40 hp four-cylinder car, at $1,100, and a 50 hp six-cylinder car, at $1,375 were offered. For 1915 a 25 hp car, selling at $765, was added.

H. H. Brooks, former Sales Manager for Marathon was General Manager. He joined Marmon as a Sales Manager in 1917 when Herff-Brooks automobile production stopped. The Wayne Works were turned over for War production.

See also
Marathon Motor Works
Marathon Automobile

References

External links
 Herff-Brooks Information on Pinterest

Defunct motor vehicle manufacturers of the United States
Motor vehicle manufacturers based in Indiana
Defunct companies based in Indiana
Vehicle manufacturing companies established in 1915
Vehicle manufacturing companies disestablished in 1917
1915 establishments in Indiana
1917 disestablishments in Indiana
1910s cars
Brass Era vehicles